Angeline Tetteh-Wayoe is a Canadian radio personality, currently a host on the CBC Music network as of October 2016.

A graduate of the radio and television broadcast arts program at the Northern Alberta Institute of Technology, Tetteh-Wayoe worked for CIBK-FM in Calgary and CFXJ-FM in Toronto before joining the CBC. In her commercial radio career, she was known by the on-air name Miss Ange. She remained with CFXJ until it rebranded from Flow 93.5 to The Move in early 2016, and was then an occasional guest host on Radio 2 Morning until being named the new permanent weekend host in October following the departure of Talia Schlanger.

Her new show, entitled The Block, is a program devoted to Black musical genres such as hip hop, soul and rhythm and blues. It airs every weeknight, and debuted in February 2021.

She was the host of the Juno Awards of 2021.

References

CBC Radio hosts
Black Canadian broadcasters
Black Canadian women
Living people
Northern Alberta Institute of Technology alumni
Year of birth missing (living people)
Canadian women radio hosts